Ellettsville Downtown Historic District is a national historic district located at Ellettsville, Monroe County, Indiana.  The district encompasses 50 contributing buildings in the central business district and surrounding residential sections of Ellettsville.  It developed between about 1840 and 1953, and includes notable examples of Queen Anne, Early Commercial, Gothic Revival, and Bungalow/American Craftsman style architecture.  Notable buildings include the Robert Stimson House (c. 1840), May Presley House (C. 1850), Bradford House (c. 1878), George W. Fletcher House (c. 1875), Wickens House (1909), Capt. Gilbert Perry House (c. 1890), I.O.O.F. Building (c. 1885), Town Hall (1927), Masonic Building (1895), Knights of Pythias Building (c. 1895), First United Methodist Church (1900), and First Baptist Church (1909).

It was listed on the National Register of Historic Places in 2006.

References

Historic districts on the National Register of Historic Places in Indiana
Queen Anne architecture in Indiana
Bungalow architecture in Indiana
Gothic Revival architecture in Indiana
Buildings and structures in Monroe County, Indiana
Historic districts in Monroe County, Indiana
National Register of Historic Places in Monroe County, Indiana